Glenn Kulka (born March 3, 1964) is a Canadian retired professional wrestler, hockey and football player who competed in Canadian independent promotions during the late 1990s and had a brief stint in the World Wrestling Federation in 1997.

He also, at one time, held the North American pro football bench press record, pressing 225 pounds for 53 reps.

Career

Early career
Born in Edmonton, Alberta, to Stan and Jeannine Kulka, (the youngest of four children) Glenn Kulka began playing hockey in the minor leagues with the British Columbia Hockey League with the Cowichan Valley Capitals in 1980 and the Medicine Hat Tigers, Spokane Flyers and the Nanaimo Islanders in the Western Hockey League from 1981 to 1983. Kulka then was a standout defensive lineman for two years (1984, 85) with the Bakersfield College Renegades in the PAC 9 JC Conference of California.  While in Bakersfield, Kulka had "Gotta Win" tattooed on his left shoulder. He signed his first professional contract, in 1986, with the Edmonton Eskimos, (as an offensive lineman) later playing with Montreal, Toronto, Saskatchewan, (and retiring) while playing for the Ottawa Roughriders. Signing with the Ottawa Rough Riders as an offensive lineman and defensive end in 1990, he later was part of the Canadian All-Star Team the following year.

While playing with the Ottawa Rough Riders, he was arrested and was fined $300 for cocaine possession in March 1992 . The CFL also responded by issuing Kulka an additional $500 fine and was ordered to act as the organization's official anti-drug spokesman.

He later re-entered professional hockey joining the Hampton Roads Admirals in the East Coast Hockey League during 1993 and 1994. Kulka joined the Saskatchewan Roughriders in 1995 and, after teaming with Bret "The Hitman" Hart in a tag team match against "Million Dollar Man" Ted DiBiase and "Psycho" Sid Vicious in a fundraising event for the Roughriders, Kulka became interested in pursuing a career in professional wrestling.

Kulka later appeared with teammates Mike Anderson, Bobby Jurasin and Scott Hendrickson on WWF Superstars supporting Bret Hart at ringside during a match against "Psycho" Sid Vicious and Ted DiBiase's Million Dollar Corporation which included King Kong Bundy, Kama and Bodydonna Skip at the Regina Agridome in Regina, Saskatchewan on November 4, 1995.

Bret Hart later offered to train Kulka, and, with Leo Burke, Kulka spent the next two years training in Calgary, Alberta and later toured with Emile Dupree's Grand Prix Wrestling during the summer of 1997.

World Wrestling Federation
Later signed to a developmental contract with the WWF, he began appearing on WWF house shows in late-1997. He was ringside with Ahmed Johnson against Rocky Maivia and the Nation of Domination on November 7, 1997, at the Skydome in Toronto. Two days later, on November 10, 1997, at a television taping for Monday Night Raw, he defeated Sexton Hardcastle in a Dark Match at the Corel Center in Ottawa.

He later scored victories over Doug Furnas, Miguel Perez, Jr. and a young Edge before the end of the year  and was also scheduled to make a one night appearance with Team Canada at the 1997 Survivor Series with "British Bulldog" Davey Boy Smith, Jim "The Anvil" Neidhart and Tiger Ali Singh against Team USA which included The Patriot, Vader, Dude Love and Goldust on November 9, 1997  although Kulka and Singh were replaced with Doug Furnas & Phil LaFon while the Patriot and Dude Love were replaced by Marc Mero and Steve Blackman.

After suffering a broken leg during a match against The Jackyl in Regina during early 1998, Kulka was forced to undergo corrective surgery remaining inactive for six months while in rehab. While recovering from his injury, he was invited to the WWF Training Dojo training under Dory Funk, Jr. and made several appearances at the Dojo teaming with Tom Howard against the Hardy Boyz on September 24 and participated in a 14-man "WWF Dojo" Battle Royal at the NWA 50th Anniversary Show on October 24, 1998 won by Steve Williams.

He would also appear at the WWF Dojo teaming with Jose Estrada, Jr. against The Truth Commission (Recon & Sniper) on February 5, 1999.

Power Pro Wrestling
Sent to the Memphis-based Power Pro Wrestling, a WWF developmental territory, he first appeared as a masked wrestler who came to Michael Hayes defense after being disqualified in a match against Baldo after interference from Downtown Bruno during a televised match on March 20, 1999. As members of manager Randy Hales stable attempted to attack Hayes after the match, a masked wrestler ran into the ring giving Hayes a high five before suddenly turning on him.

After Downtown Bruno handcuffed Hayes, Kulka helped members of Hales' stable to carry Hayes out of the arena and into the trunk of a car driven by "Irish Assassin" Mick Tierney who drove off with Hayes inside. In an interview following this incident, Randy Hales revealed the masked wrestler as Glen Kulka, a former CFL player and "cousin" of Michael Hayes.

Aligning himself with Hales' group, he would face several veterans including Doug Furnas, "Dirty White Boy" Tony Anthony and Kurt Angle as well as teaming with JR Smooth and Mick Tierney during his feud with Allan Steele during early 1999. While there, he would participate in two "Weapon Battle Royals" as well as an 8-man match for the Young Guns title against Kurt Angle, Allan Steele, Mick Tierney, Kid Wikkid, Derrick King, Bulldog Raines and Vic Grimes on May 8, 1999.

Retirement
In 1999, Kulka defeated The Godfather by disqualification at a WWF house show in Ottawa on June 21 in his last appearance with the company. Remaining with Power Pro Wrestling for the next several months, he and Mick Tierney were awarded the PPW Tag Team titles on October 2 after Bill Dundee left the promotion. However, the titles became vacant after Kulka left the promotion himself in November.

Released from his contract by the WWF in February 2000, he later feuded with Pierre-Carl Ouellet in Northern Championship Wrestling, facing him at ChallengeMania 8 in May 2000. Although alleged to be in negotiations with Extreme Championship Wrestling, Kulka retired from professional wrestling soon after his release.

Recent years
Returning to Ottawa, he endeavored to start a gym and managed a Ford car dealership. In 2004, Kulka was asked by Ottawa sports station The Team 1200 to cover on-field commentary for the Ottawa Renegades. This eventually led to a regular spot as a co-host for Team 1200's Over the Edge, a popular sports talk radio show on CFGO. However, as of November 27, 2009 Kulka was laid-off by CHUM Radio due to cutbacks.

In late 2006, he made two guest appearances on the sports talk show Off the Record.

Glenn still lives in Ottawa, with his wife Mariko, and his two children, Laura and Jaxson. He is one of several former CFL players to publicly admit to steroid use during his professional career.

Glenn made his MMA debut against Wayne Xilon on the Freedom Fight Card held on July 26, 2008, at The Robert Guertin Arena in Gatineau, Quebec. Glenn defeated Xilon by TKO at 1:13 of the first round.

Glen made another debut, acting as Charles the Wrestler in the Third Wall Theatre Company's production of Shakespeare's "As You Like It" held February 4 to the 14th, 2010.
personal trainer at a local gym.

Championships and accomplishments
Power Pro Wrestling
PPW Tag Team Championship (1 time) with Mick Tierney
Pro Wrestling Illustrated
PWI ranked him # 392 of the 500 best singles wrestlers of the PWI 500 in 2000

References

External links
Profile at Online World of Wrestling 
Other Superstars - Glen Kulka
CageMatch.de - Glen Kulka 
SportsShooter.com - Special Gallery, a photo of Glen Kulka taken by the Ottawa Sun

 https://web.archive.org/web/20100209004505/http://www.ottawacitizen.com/Theatre+review+Like/2532218/story.html

1964 births
Canadian football defensive linemen
Canadian football offensive linemen
Canadian male professional wrestlers
Canadian male mixed martial artists
Mixed martial artists utilizing wrestling
Canadian radio sportscasters
Cowichan Valley Capitals players
Edmonton Elks players
Hampton Roads Admirals players
Living people
Medicine Hat Tigers players
Montreal Alouettes players
Nanaimo Islanders players
Ottawa Rough Riders players
Players of Canadian football from Alberta
Professional wrestlers from Alberta
Saskatchewan Roughriders players
Spokane Flyers players
Sportspeople from Edmonton
Ice hockey people from Edmonton
Canadian football people from Edmonton
Toronto Argonauts players
American male professional wrestlers